Pigeonholing is a process that attempts to classify disparate entities into a limited number of categories (usually, mutually exclusive ones).

The term usually carries connotations of criticism, implying that the classification scheme referred to inadequately reflects the entities being sorted, or that it is based on stereotypes.

When considering various classification schemes, one must be aware of the following pitfalls:

Using categories that are poorly defined (e.g., because they are subjective).
Entities may be suited to more than one category. Example: rhubarb is both "poisonous" and "edible".
Entities may not fit into any available category. Example: asking somebody from Washington, D.C. which state they live in.
Entities may change over time, so they no longer fit the category in which they have been placed. Example: certain species of fish may change from male to female during their life.
Attempting to discretize properties that would be better viewed as a continuum must be taken with caution. Example: while sorting people into "introverted" and "extroverted" one must keep in mind that most people exhibit both traits to some degree.

An example of pigeonholing in everyday conversation occurs when a person making an apolitical or barely political comment is assumed to have a certain political belief, without ascertaining their political stance. Such an erroneous designation is especially erroneous when assigning it to people who live in places where the left–right dichotomy is not present.

See also
 Archetype
 Labelling
 Pigeonhole principle
 Typecasting

References

Stereotypes